Permanent Record: The Very Best Of is a greatest hits album by the band Violent Femmes. It was released on July 12, 2005.

Track listing

Personnel
Gordon Gano – Lead vocals, guitar, violin (3, 4, 7, 13)
Brian Ritchie – Bass, vocals, xylophone (3, 4), jaw harp (6), guitar (8, 11), didgeridoo (11), reed organ (12), guitar solo (12, 14)
Victor DeLorenzo – Drums, vocals (tracks 1–11, 17)
Guy Hoffman – Drums, vocals (tracks 12, 13, 14, 15, 16)

Additional musicians
Michael Blair – Percussion (track 11, 13)
Steve Mackay – Saxophone (track 9)

References

2005 greatest hits albums
Violent Femmes compilation albums
Rhino Records compilation albums